Aata Bombata is a 1990 Indian Kannada language film directed by B. C. Gowrishankar starring Shankar Nag and Srilatha. The supporting cast features Sudheer, Ramakrishna, Mysore Lokesh, Ramesh Bhat and Thriveni. The dialogues in the film were written by Veerappa Maralavadi and Upendra; the latter would go on to become a popular director and actor in Kannada cinema.

Cast
 Shankar Nag
 Srilatha
 Sudheer
 Ramakrishna
 Mysore Lokesh
 Ramesh Bhat
 Thriveni
 Honnavalli Krishna
 Tennis Krishna
 Thoogudeepa Srinivas in a cameo appearance
 G. K. Govinda Rao in a cameo appearance

Soundtrack
Hamsalekha composed the music for the soundtracks in the film. The album has four tracks.

References

1990 films
1990s Kannada-language films
Films scored by Hamsalekha